The ITFA Best Music Director Award is given by the state government as part of its annual International Tamil Film Awards for Tamil  (Kollywood) films. The award was first given in 2003.

The list
Here is a list of the award winners and the films for which they won.

See also

 Tamil cinema
 Cinema of India

References

Music Director
Film awards for Best Music Director